Hideki Matsutake (born August 12, 1951 in Yokohama, Kanagawa Prefecture, Japan) is a Japanese composer, arranger, and computer programmer. He is known for his pioneering work in electronic music and particularly music programming, as the assistant of Isao Tomita during the early 1970s and as the "fourth member" of the band Yellow Magic Orchestra during the late 1970s to early 1980s.

Through his participation in the session recording of Ryuichi Sakamoto's 1978 album Thousand Knives, he joined the recordings of Yellow Magic Orchestra during 1978-1982 as their sound programmer, to become known as "the fourth member" of the group. In 1981, he formed a unit of his own under the name Logic System, which released its latest album in 2020. He also continued to take part in solo activities by YMO members such as Haruomi Hosono and Yukihiro Takahashi beyond the group's breakup in 1983. He was also a member of the video game music group Akihabara Electric Circus in 1988 and composed music for the 1996 video game Guardian Heroes. Today, Matsutake is also Chairman of Japan Synthesizer Programmers Association (JSPA).

Biography
Matsutake was grabbed by the playback of Wendy Carlos's Switched-On Bach using a synthesizer and a computer at the American Pavilion of Expo '70 in Osaka. In June the following year at age 19, he made his first step into professional music as an apprentice to Isao Tomita, providing him the chance of operating one of the few Moog III-P synthesizer units in Japan.

Establishing a company of his own named Musical Advertising Corporation (MAC) in 1974, his involvement with 'new music' artists such as Yoshitaka Minami and Akiko Yano started. In 1978 he participated in the production of Ryuichi Sakamoto's first album, Thousand Knives. In the years 1978 to 1982, Matsutake served Yellow Magic Orchestra as its sound programmer, eventually to become known as the "fourth member" of the band. He also led sequencing work for numerous technopop albums by other artists, especially at the beginning of the 80s.

In 1981, Matsutake formed "Logic System" with Makoto Irie, with whom he toured to perform in other Asian countries several times. The unit has released 10 albums to date, two out of them released in eight countries. Its latest album is Technasma, released in 2020. He was a member of Akihabara Electric Circus, which released the chiptune album Super Mario Bros. 3: Akihabara Electric Circus in 1988. He composed the video game music for Treasure's Guardian Heroes in 1996, alongside Nazo Suzuki. Matsutake is currently chairman of Japan Synthesizer Programmers Association (JSPA).

Discography

Discography

Notes

References
  Profile of Hideki Matsuake found in a special interview article Hideki Matsutake plays with Terumin (松武秀樹 ふろくのテルミンで遊ぶ) on Gakken (publisher), viewed on 2009-03-28.
  Article: Interview with Hideki Matsutake - Marking his 30th year of Techno life (祝テクノライフ30周年～松武秀樹氏) on All About, viewed 2009-03-09.
 Interview with Hideki Matsutake about YMO, Logic System, Modulars and beyond here.
 An example showing general recognition of Matsutake as being a part of YMO can be seen here.

External links
 Logic System Homepage
 Logic System at discogs

1951 births
Japanese composers
Japanese electro musicians
Japanese electronic musicians
Japanese male composers
Living people
Musicians from Kanagawa Prefecture
Musicians from Yokohama